Leichhardt County is one of the 141 Cadastral divisions of New South Wales. It is located south of the Namoi River and includes land on both sides of the Castlereagh River, including Coonamble.

Leichhardt County was named in honour of the Prussian naturalist and explorer Friedrich Wilhelm Ludwig Leichhardt (1813-1848).

Parishes within the county
A full list of parishes found within this county; their current LGA and mapping coordinates to the approximate centre of each location is as follows:

References

Counties of New South Wales